There are seven listed buildings in Grangetown, Cardiff, Wales and they are all listed Grade II. Grangetown developed as a suburb in the second half of the nineteenth century, on what had previously been farmland to the south of Cardiff.

Grade II listed buildings are of special architectural or historical interest.

Listed buildings

See also
 Architecture of Cardiff
 Listed buildings in Cardiff

Sources
 Listed Buildings in Grangetown, Cardiff, Wales, BritishListedBuildings.co.uk

References

Cardiff-related lists
Grangetown
Grangetown, Cardiff
Grangetown